Thomas Keenan (19 May 1923 – 7 April 1981) was an Irish basketball player. He competed in the men's tournament at the 1948 Summer Olympics.

References

External links
 

1923 births
1981 deaths
Irish men's basketball players
Olympic basketball players of Ireland
Basketball players at the 1948 Summer Olympics
Sportspeople from Glasgow